The 2023 season is the 11th season in the existence of Iwaki FC. Is it the club's first season in the J2 League, the second tier of Japanese football after becoming champions of the J3 League in 2022. As well as the domestic league, they will compete in the Emperor's Cup.

Squad

Season squad

Transfers

Arrivals

Departures

Pre-season and friendlies

Competitions

J2 League

Results by matchday

Matches
The full league fixtures were released on 20 January 2023.

Emperor's Cup

Statistics

Goalscorers 
The list is sorted by shirt number when total goals are equal.

Clean sheets
The list is sorted by shirt number when total clean sheets are equal.

References 

Iwaki FC